Mertim, an acronym for Mersin Ticaret Merkezi (Mersin Trade Center), is a 52-story skyscraper in Mersin, Turkey. It was the tallest building in Turkey between 1987 and 2000, until the completion of the İş Bankası Towers in Istanbul. It is also the tallest hotel building in Turkey.

History 
The Port of Mersin, which is the largest seaport in Turkey and the main port for international trade with the Turkish Republic of Northern Cyprus, had been declared as a free trade zone and a series of buildings were constructed in the city to be used in business and commerce, which included the Mertim Tower.

The construction 
The architect of the complex was Cengiz Bektaş who designed the building in 1985. The tower was constructed during the second half of the 1980s by the Üstay Corporation. The tower was completed in 1987 and the entire complex entered service in 1993. Immediately after its opening in 1993, a part of the building was used by the University of Mersin for several years during the 1990s.

Building 
The complex at  includes a shopping center of 1100 stores and a 52-floor skyscraper which is popularly known as Metropol or the Tower. Sixteen floors of the building are used as a hotel and the rest are reserved for offices. At present, the hotel is operated by the Radisson Hotel Group.

References

External links
 Emporis: Mertim Tower

Economy of Mersin Province
Mersin
Office buildings in Turkey
Skyscrapers in Turkey
Skyscraper hotels
Skyscraper office buildings in Turkey